is a passenger railway station located in the town of Mizuho, Tokyo, Japan, operated by East Japan Railway Company (JR East).

Lines
The station is 15.7 kilometers from the official starting point of the line at Hachiōji.

Station layout

The station consists of an elevated station building, built over an island platform serving two tracks, which form a passing loop on the single-track line. The station is staffed.

Platforms

History
The station opened on 10 December 1931. It became part of the East Japan Railway Company (JR East) with the breakup of the Japanese National Railways on 1 April 1987.

The southern section of the Hachikō Line between Hachiōji and Komagawa was electrified on 16 March 1996, with through services commencing between Hachiōji and Kawagoe.

Passenger statistics
In fiscal 2019, the station was used by an average of 4,384 passengers daily (boarding passengers only).

The passenger figures for previous years are as shown below.

Surrounding area
Mizuho Town Hall

References

External links

 JR East Station information 

Railway stations in Japan opened in 1931
Railway stations in Tokyo
Stations of East Japan Railway Company
Hachikō Line
Mizuho, Tokyo